Dorymyrmex elegans is a species of ant in the genus Dorymyrmex. Described by Trager in 1988, the species is endemic to the United States and Mexico, where it is a nocturnal species and is normally seen on cool days.

References

External links 
 
 Dorymyrmex elegans at insectoid.info

elegans
Hymenoptera of North America
Insects described in 1988